Roses à crédit is a 2010 French drama film co-written and directed by Amos Gitai and starring Léa Seydoux and Grégoire Leprince-Ringuet. It is based on the 1959 novel of the same name by Elsa Triolet. It received its premiere at the 2010 Toronto International Film Festival.

Cast

References

External links 
 

2010 films
2010 drama films
2010s French-language films
French drama films
French television films
Films set in the 1940s
Films set in the 1950s
Films based on French novels
Films directed by Amos Gitai
2010s French films